Jacques Wingfield (1519–1587) was an Anglo-Irish soldier and public official of the Tudor era. He is also sometimes known as John Wingfield or Jack Wingfield.

Life

He was the son of Richard Wingfield and Bridget Wingfield, who was the heiress of Stone Castle. He spent much of his youth in Calais, which was then an English possession. Fluent in French he spent time in Paris at the French court. In 1553 he briefly sat as a Member of Parliament for Taunton. Following the death of his patron Stephen Gardiner, whom he had accompanied on several diplomatic missions, he went to Ireland where he was made the Constable of Dublin Castle and Master of Ordnance.

He was appointed to the Irish Council by the Lord Lieutenant of Ireland Thomas Radclyffe, 3rd Earl of Sussex, of whom he was a noted supporter. Along with Sir Nicholas Heron, Wingfield had special responsibilities concerning Gaelic inhabitants. In 1561 he suffered a military defeat during a skirmish with Shane O'Neill, the leading Gaelic lord in Ulster, who enjoyed strained relations with the Crown. Although Elizabeth I wanted him to be dismissed from his post for this reverse, Sussex and William Cecil lobbied on his behalf and he remained in office until his death.

Later in his career in Ireland, Wingfield secured land in the Munster Plantation. The Wingfields became a powerful New English family in Ireland. Among his relatives was Richard Wingfield, a soldier who was instrumental in the defeat of O'Doherty's Rebellion in 1608. Jacques' nephew Edward Maria Wingfield was largely raised by him, after his father's early death, and went on to be a notable settler in Virginia.

References

Bibliography
 Ellis, Steven G. Ireland in the Age of the Tudors, 1447-1603. Longman, 1998.
 Foster, Thomas A. New Men: Manliness in Early America. NYU Press, 2011.

People of Elizabethan Ireland
16th-century Irish people
English soldiers
Irish soldiers
English emigrants to Ireland
1587 deaths
People from Calais
1519 births